Pierre Marie Antoine Pasquier (6 February 1877 – 15 January 1934) was a French colonial administrator.

French Indochina
Pasquier served as the governor-general of French Indochina two times; from October 1926 to May 1927 (in temporary replacement of Alexandre Varenne) and from December 1928 to January 1934.

Works

See also
 Dewoitine D.332

References

Further reading

External links

 Entry in Léonore (Légion d'honneur) database

1877 births
1934 deaths
Governors-General of French Indochina
Knights Grand Cross of the Order of Orange-Nassau